Mubāḥ (Arabic: مباح) is an Arabic word meaning "permitted", which has technical uses in Islamic law.

In uṣūl al-fiqh (principles of Islamic jurisprudence), mubāḥ is one of the five degrees of approval (ahkam):
  - compulsory, obligatory
  - recommended
  - neutral, not involving God's judgment
  - disliked, reprehensible
  - forbidden

Mubah is commonly translated as "neutral", "indifferent" or "(merely) permitted". It refers to an action that is not mandatory, recommended, reprehensible or forbidden, and thus involves no judgement from God. Assigning acts to this legal category reflects a deliberate choice rather than an oversight on the part of jurists.

In Islamic property law, the term mubāḥ refers to things which have no owner. It is similar to the concept res nullius used in Roman law and common law.

See also 

 Adiaphora, a similar concept in Stoicism
 Halal

References

Arabic words and phrases
Arabic words and phrases in Sharia
Islamic terminology
Sharia legal terminology